Eurojet Airlines was an airline based in France founded in 2003. It was closed on January 2, 2004 due to bankruptcy.

Fleet
The company fleet consisted of a Boeing 737-400 (registration code F-GNAO), leased from a Swiss aircompany Avione which was later on March 4, 2004 acquired by Islandsflug.

References

External links
Eurojet Airlines Jet Fleet Detail

Defunct airlines of France
Airlines established in 2003
Airlines disestablished in 2004